Back of the Moon was a Scottish musical group from the Isle of Arran which played both new and Scottish traditional tunes and songs cast in modern sounding arrangements. Since forming in 2000, the band had toured annually throughout the UK, Canada, United States and eight different European Countries. Back of the Moon created an acoustic sound through a front line of Scottish border pipes and fiddle, a pairing of low whistle and flute, and their guitar/piano rhythm combo. They were at times augmented by bodhran and Cape Breton Stepdancing, and three-part vocal harmonies in their Scottish songs in which each singer took the lead.

They formed in 2000 under the name Gillian Frame & Back of the Moon, with Findlay Napier joining in 2001, and signed with Foot Stompin'Records. They released their first album, Gillian Frame and Back of the Moon in 2001, after Frame won the BBC Radio Scotland Young Traditional Musician award the year before. They changed their name in 2003 to simply Back of the Moon, after releasing their second album. In 2003, they won "Best Up and Coming Act at the Scots Trad Music Awards and "Best Celtic Group" at Festival Interceltique de Lorient. In 2005, they won "Best Folk Band" at the Scots Trad Music Awards.

They played their final US tour in the Kennedy Centre, Washington DC, in November 2007.

Discography
 Gillian Frame and Back of the Moon (2001)
 Fortune's Road (2003)
 Luminosity (2005)

Band members
2000-03
 Gillian Frame (fiddle, vocals)
 Simon McKerrell (border pipes, uilleann pipes, whistles, vocals)
 Hamish Napier (piano, whistles, vocals)
 Findlay Napier (guitar, vocals) (joined early 2001)

2003- 2007
 Findlay Napier (guitar, vocals)
 Gillian Frame (fiddle, vocals)
 Ali Hutton (border pipes, whistles, bodhran)
 Hamish Napier (piano, whistles, flutes, vocals)

External links
Official Site
Footstompin, the UK record label to which Back of the Moon is currently signed.
Mad River Records, the US record label on which Back of the Moon's album's are currently released in the US.

References

Scottish folk music groups
Musical groups established in 2000